Redcliffe Hall was an early purpose-built playhouse on Redcliffe Hill, Bristol, England operating in the 17th century.  It was built by Richard Barker, certainly before 1637 and possibly as early as 1604. Together with the Wine Street playhouse, Bristol thus had two purpose-built theatres, more than any other provincial city of the time.

References
 Arthur F. Kinney, A companion to Renaissance drama, Wiley-Blackwell, 2002, . P.216.
 Jane Milling, Peter Thomson, Joseph W. Donohue, The Cambridge History of British Theatre, Cambridge University Press, 2004, .  P.194.
 M.C. Pilkinton, REED - Bristol, University of Toronto Press, 1997, .  Pp. xxxvii, lix.

Theatres in Bristol
Former buildings and structures in Bristol
Culture in Bristol